Creative COW bills itself as "Support communities for digital video, video editing, and media production professionals in broadcasting, motion graphics, special FX and film." As well as publishing a trade magazine, it provides over 200 online support discussion forums spanning a wide range of professional video tools and software, also offers over 1,000 text and video tutorials at no charge, has nearly two dozen different podcasts (available at the iTunes Store and other aggregators), as well as other resources for video professionals. Creative COW is funded by advertising and sponsorship from manufacturers.

According to their website, Creative COW was started in April 2001 by Kathlyn and Ron Lindeboom, as an evolution of the earlier Media 100 Worldwide Users Group (WWUG). COW stands for "Communities of the World".

Creative COW Magazine
In 2006 Creative COW launched a quarterly print magazine, the Creative COW Magazine, which grew in 2008 to become a bimonthly, and in 2011 was cited by a trade journal which reports on issues and trends related to the magazine printing trade, who named Creative COW Magazine as one of the FOLIO: 40 for 2011.

References

External links
 
Bimonthly magazines published in the United States
Business magazines published in the United States
Quarterly magazines published in the United States
Design magazines
Magazines established in 2006
Magazines about the media
Websites about digital media
Organizations established in 2001